Electronic Route Guidance System (ERGS)  was a 1970s era government sponsored in-vehicle navigation and route guidance system developed by the United States Federal Highway Association. ERGS was the initial stage of a larger research and development effort called the Intelligent Transportation System (ITS).  

ERGS was a destination oriented system that required a human driver to enter a destination code into the vehicle system. The vehicle communicated with an instrument intersection where the destination code was decoded and routing information was sent back to the vehicle.

Other international programs included Japan's CACS, which used FR (radio frequency) communication methods, and similar projects in Europe. These programs all used central processing systems with large central computers.

External Links

References

Intelligent transportation systems